Cardonald (Ward 4) is one of the 23 wards of Glasgow City Council. It was created in 2007 as Craigton and returned four council members using the single transferable vote system. The same name and boundaries were used in the 2012 elections. For the 2017 Glasgow City Council election, the name was changed (Craigton is the name of a historic estate and was used as a ward name in past versions of the town authority, but in modern times the urban neighbourhood known by that name did not fall within its boundaries, whereas the whole of the larger Cardonald district did) although the territory and councillor numbers remained the same.

Boundaries
Located in the southwest of Glasgow, the ward includes Cardonald as well as Hillington, Halfway, Penilee, Mosspark, Corkerhill, the northern part of Crookston and the northern part of Pollok (the Lyoncross/Templeland area north of the Levern Water, the rest of the district coming under the Greater Pollok ward).

The ethnic makeup of the Cardonald ward using the 2011 census population statistics was:

93.8% White Scottish / British / Irish / Other
4.1% Asian
1.3% Black (Mainly African)
0.7% Mixed / Other Ethnic Group

Councillors

Election Results

2022 Election
2022 Glasgow City Council election

2017 Election
2017 Glasgow City Council election

2017 by-election
Labour counsellor Alistair Watson died suddenly on 29 June 2017. A by-election was held on 7 September 2017 and was won by Jim Kavanagh of the Scottish Labour Party.

2012 Election
2012 Glasgow City Council election

2015 by-election
On 10 June 2015, SNP counsellor Iris Gibson retired due to ill health. A by-election was held on 6 August and was won by the SNP's Alex Wilson.

2007 Election
2007 Glasgow City Council election

See also
Wards of Glasgow

References

External links
Listed Buildings in Cardonald Ward, Glasgow City at British Listed Buildings

Wards of Glasgow